Plugs For The Program is an EP by Guided by Voices, released March 1999.

Track listing
 Surgical Focus (Remix)
 Sucker Of Pistol City
 Picture Me Big Time (Demo)

References

External links
 This EP at Guided by Voices Database (Or GBVDB)

1999 EPs
Guided by Voices EPs